Jonathan Fisher KC is a London barrister specialising in corporate and financial crime, proceeds of crime, and tax cases He is also a Visiting Professor at the London School of Economics.

In July 2015 UWE Bristol awarded the Honorary Degree of Doctor of Laws to Fisher in recognition of his outstanding legal expertise and academic contribution to the areas of financial and corporate law.

Fisher was awarded the Degree of Doctor of Philosophy in 2021 by The LSE for his thesis entitled “Mandatory self-reporting of criminal conduct by a company: corporate rights and engaging the privilege against self-incrimination”.

In May 2011, Fisher was appointed a Commissioner on the Bill of Rights Commission established by the Coalition Government to investigate the case for a UK Bill of Rights.

In 2006, Fisher was elected Chairman of Research of the Society of Conservative Lawyers. He held the post for four years and was included as No 62 in Conservative Home's Search for 100 peers. In July of the same year, Fisher joined the tax litigation and regulatory team at the London office of Scottish firm McGrigors with plans to requalify as a solicitor, but quit the firm six months later, returning to his work as a barrister.

In 2006 Fisher wrote a pamphlet for the Conservative Liberty Forum entitled "A British Bill of Rights and Obligations" and more recently, in 2012, he wrote a paper entitled "Rescuing Human Rights", which was published by the Henry Jackson Society. In 2015, Politeia published a pamphlet by Fisher entitled “The British Bill of Rights Protecting Freedom Under the Law.”

In 2022, Fisher contributed to Politeia’s publication "Reforming Legal Aid". In June 2022 he was elected Vice Chair of the Executive Committee of the Society of Conservative Lawyers.

References 

Members of Gray's Inn
English King's Counsel
Academics of the London School of Economics
Living people
Year of birth missing (living people)